is a Japanese badminton player, affiliated with the Sanyo electric team. Shiota was the bronze medallist at the 2007 World Championships in the women's doubles event partnered with Kumiko Ogura. She also won the silver and bronze medals at the 2006 Asian Games in the women's team and doubles respectively. Shiota competed at the Olympic Games two times, in 2008 Beijing in the women's doubles event with Ogura, and in 2012 London in the mixed doubles event partnered with Shintaro Ikeda.

Career 
Shiota was born in Kanda, Fukuoka, and after graduating from the Kyushu International University comes High School in 2002, she join the Sanyo Electric team. Partnered with Kumiko Ogura, they well-known as "Ogushio", became the women's doubles runner-up at the 2005 Asian Championships. She and Ogura won their first world grand prix title at the 2005 Denmark Open. In 2006, they won the women's doubles bronze medal at the Doha 2006 Asian Games, after defeated by Yang Wei and Zhang Jiewen in the semi finals. Shiota also help the Japanese women's team won the silver medal in the women's team event. 

Shiota won the women's doubles bronze medal in the 2007 World Championships in Kuala Lumpur, Malaysia. Ogushio were defeated in the semifinals by Gao Ling and Huang Sui of China, 16–21, 25–23, 6–21. In May 2008, she and Ogura ranked 6 in BWF World Ranking, and qualified to compete at the Beijing 2008 Summer Olympics. In the first round they beat the Danish pair Lena Frier Kristiansen and Kamilla Rytter Juhl in the rubber games, but was defeated by Du Jing and Yu Yang of China in the second round in the straight games.

In 2009, she started to team-up with Shintaro Ikeda from Unisys, and in May 2010, Shiota also join the Unisys team. Shiota and Ikeda well-known as "Ikeshio", and they reaching the final round at the 2010 Dutch Open, 2011 German and Russian Open, and also in the BWF Superseries tournament at the 2012 Singapore Open, but they only finished as the runner-up. The Ikeshio participated at the 2012 Olympic Games in London, but the duo did not advance to the knock-out stage, after placing third in the group stage. At the competition, they won a match to Canadian pair Toby Ng and Grace Gao in the rubber games with the score 21–10, 11–21, 21–15, and lost in the straight games to Joachim Fischer Nielsen and Christinna Pedersen of Denmark, and Robert Mateusiak and Nadieżda Kostiuczyk of Poland in group B stage.

Personal life
On September 30, 2012 she married the footballer Tatsuya Masushima.

Achievements

BWF World Championships 
Women's doubles

Asian Games 
Women's doubles

Asian Championships 
Women's doubles

BWF Superseries  
The BWF Superseries, launched on 14 December 2006 and implemented in 2007, is a series of elite badminton tournaments, sanctioned by Badminton World Federation (BWF). BWF Superseries has two level such as Superseries and Superseries Premier. A season of Superseries features twelve tournaments around the world, which introduced since 2011, with successful players invited to the Superseries Finals held at the year end.

Women's doubles

 BWF Superseries Finals tournament
 BWF Superseries Premier tournament
 BWF Superseries tournament

BWF Grand Prix
The BWF Grand Prix has two levels, the Grand Prix and Grand Prix Gold. It is a series of badminton tournaments, sanctioned by the Badminton World Federation (BWF) since 2007. The World Badminton Grand Prix sanctioned by International Badminton Federation since 1983.

Women's doubles

Mixed doubles

 BWF Grand Prix Gold tournament
 BWF & IBF Grand Prix tournament

BWF International Challenge/Series/Satellite
Women's doubles

 BWF International Challenge tournament
 BWF International Series tournament

Record against selected opponents
Mixed doubles results with Shintaro Ikeda against Super Series finalists, Worlds Semi-finalists, and Olympic quarterfinalists:

  Zhang Nan & Zhao Yunlei 0–1
  He Hanbin & Yu Yang
  Tao Jiaming & Tian Qing 0–3
  Chen Hung-ling & Cheng Wen-hsing 0–3
  Chris Adcock &  Imogen Bankier 0–2
  Anthony Clark & Donna Kellogg 0–2
  Tontowi Ahmad & Liliyana Natsir 0–2
  Nova Widianto & Liliyana Natsir 0–2
  Lee Yong-dae & Ha Jung-eun 0–2
  Robert Mateusiak & Nadieżda Zięba 2–0
  Songphon Anugritayawon & Kunchala Voravichitchaikul 1–2
  Sudket Prapakamol & Saralee Thungthongkam 1–1

References

External links 
 
 

Japanese female badminton players
Living people
1983 births
Sportspeople from Fukuoka Prefecture
Badminton players at the 2008 Summer Olympics
Badminton players at the 2012 Summer Olympics
Olympic badminton players of Japan
Asian Games medalists in badminton
Asian Games silver medalists for Japan
Asian Games bronze medalists for Japan
Badminton players at the 2006 Asian Games
Badminton players at the 2010 Asian Games
Medalists at the 2006 Asian Games